China Education Television (CETV) ( and IPA pronunciation ) is an educational TV station in the People's Republic of China. Its first broadcast was on October 1, 1986. Its function is to provide Chinese people with educational programs, similar to PBS in the United States or NHK Educational TV in Japan.

Free Channels 
China ETV-1 (broadcast across China)CETV Channel 1 has been officially broadcasting since 1986 and was orientated as a comprehensive education channel focusing on China education and human resource development. It is the only satellite channel which enjoys the same policy support as CCTV-1, and is also the only satellite channel which covers more than 2,000 colleges and universities in addition to 400,000 primary and secondary schools through ChinaSat 9, ChinaSat 6B and Apstar 6 transmission. Above 92% users have joined cable TV and about 971 million people are covered. CETV mainly publicizes the communist party and national education policies in form of educational culture programs, public service programs, and campus fashion programs.
    
China ETV-2 (broadcast across China)CETV Channel 2 covers satellite TV channels in the whole nation as well as Southeast Asia region and mainly broadcasts the continuing education courses of China Central Radio & TV University in order to provide a learning platform for China Central Radio & TV University students and to service China's ‘Adult Education’ and ‘Vocational Education’. The courses consist of a wide range of subjects covering literature, law, finance, economics, science, engineering, agriculture, medicine, etc.

China ETV-3 (broadcast only in Beijing)CETV Channel 3, a humanistic education channel broadcast in Beijing and is the pioneer documentary channel in China. Its audience rating ranks top 20 among more than 70 Beijing landing channels. Channel 3 observers people's real lives in the form of documentaries, having broadcast numerous ‘Humanity’, ‘Science and Technology’, and ‘Educational’ programmes.

China ETV-4 (broadcast across China)CETV Channel 4,formerly Air-classroom Channel, a welfare satellite channel covering the whole nation, focused on primary and secondary schools, teachers and parents and provides documentaries. Since 2003, Air Class Channel played an important role in resumption of school classes in events like the SARS outbreak, Sichuan Earthquake and Yushu Earthquake. On December 11, 2008, the State Administration of Radio Film and Television gave an official reply to approve the air class by CETV. The Air Class Channel was revised on January 1, 2012 by combining the documentaries and textbooks.

Pay Channel 
China ETV- Early Education ChannelThe ‘Early Education Channel’ officially started broadcasting in 2005 and is the only national channel for early child education. Mainly for 0-12 year-olds, but also covering pre-natal education for mothers. The channel maintains programing across more than 150 of the majority cities in China, through China's first digital TV transmission platform and digital pay channels.

Internet Television 
China ETV - China Education Network TelevisionChina Education Network Television, approved by the State Press and Publication Administration of Radio (formerly SARFT) to use broadband Internet, mobile communication networks and other emerging technologies as the medium to promote the delivery of cultural and educational messages, guide online public opinion and deliver to citizens, especially young masses, a rich cultural life. It is the only professional national education online channel, to provide users with content aggregation, live, on demand, upload, share, learn, trade and is the only international channel available to foreigners to learn Chinese language and culture.

History 
The network was founded on October 1, 1986.

On June 24, 2015, the station changed its logo on all of its channels.

References

External links
  

Television networks in China
Television channels and stations established in 1986
Mass media in Beijing